Lafayette Boulevard (also referred to as Lafayette Street and Lafayette Avenue) is a major east-west street through the city of Detroit, extending from the southeast side through downtown into the southwest side, ending at Woodmere Cemetery. Lafayette Boulevard, like certain other east-west streets that had ended in southwest Detroit east of Woodmere Cemetery, reappears in the suburb of Lincoln Park, Michigan. The stretch through downtown Detroit is lined with structures including the Detroit Free Press Building and Greektown Casino Hotel.

This list below shows the information on the buildings located along Lafayette Boulevard in the city of Detroit.

References

External links

Streets in Michigan
Transportation in Detroit